The AMA EnduroCross Championship is an endurocross championship held in North America since 2007. It is held in stadiums or arenas, recreating enduro obstacles such as rocks, boulders and logs.

Motorsport promoters Eric Peronnard and Tim Clark organized the first EnduroCross event at the Orleans Arena in Las Vegas in 2004, with a similar format to the Barcelona Indoor Enduro. In 2007, EnduroCross turned into a three-round championship with AMA sanctioning. Since 2008, at least six rounds have been held each year. In 2011 and 2012, the X Games Los Angeles was a points-scoring round of the AMA EnduroCross.

Las Vegas has hosted the final round from 2007 to 2013, and the first round from 2008 to 2010 and since 2012. Cities that have hosted the AMA EnduroCross include Denver, Everett, Boise and Ontario. Most of the events have been held in the West.

In 2006, the owners sold EnduroCross to Primedia, later Source Interlink and TEN: The Enthusiast Network. In 2017, TEN sold the series to the Bonnier Motorcycle Group.

Taddy Blazusiak holds the record of main event wins in EnduroCross with 29 as of the 2013 season. No other rider has collected five main event wins. Geoff Aaron has collected 15 podiums, Mike Brown 13, Cody Webb 12, Colton Haaker 9 and Damon Huffman 9, all of which have also won main events.

Champions

References

External links
 AMA EnduroCross official website
 Event Promoter Eric Peronnard Talks About Taking EnduroCross on the Road to X Games - Eastern Dirt Magazine
 EnduroCross Editorial: 10 Years After - Cycle News
 What Really Happened: EnduroCross Finals In Las Vegas Nevada - Dirt Rider

Motorcycle off-road racing series
Motorsport competitions in the United States
Endurocross